Bog huckleberry is a common name for several plants and may refer to:

Gaylussacia bigeloviana, native to coastal plains of eastern North America
Vaccinium uliginosum, widely distributed in the northern hemisphere